Sir Alexander James Reid, 3rd Baronet,  (6 December 1932 – 8 April 2019) was High Sheriff of Cambridgeshire from 1987 to 1988.

Life

He was born on 6 December 1932 and educated at Eton and Magdalene College, Cambridge. He served in Malaya with the Gordon Highlanders and was Captain of the 3rd Battalion (TA) until 1964.

Family
He married Michaela Kier on 15 October 1955; they had one son (the heir, Charles Edward James Reid, born 24 June 1956) and three daughters.

Other
A Director of Ellon Castle Estates from 1965 to 1996, he was also Chairman of Governors at Heath Mount School from 1976 to 1992.

References

See also

1932 births
2019 deaths
People educated at Eton College
Alumni of Magdalene College, Cambridge
Gordon Highlanders officers
Deputy Lieutenants of Cambridgeshire
High Sheriffs of Cambridgeshire
Baronets in the Baronetage of the United Kingdom
English justices of the peace